Sri Sri Kali Mata Mandir is one of the famous Hindu temples in Bangladesh. According to legend, the goddess Kali appeared miraculously at the location about 108 years ago. It is located between the villages of Fandauk and Morakari in Lakhai upazila of Habiganj district of Bangladesh.

History 
The temple of Sri Sri Kali Mata was miraculously established in Bengal around 1320 AD. The temple is currently being run jointly by the people of Fandauk and Morakari villages. Work is currently underway to replace the old temple with a new one in the form of a temple on the back. According to the name of the temple, there is a field of Fandauk Kali temple. Every year on the occasion of Maha Ashtami, worship of Kali Mata is performed in that field and thousands of devotees, saints get full benefit by bathing on the banks of the mighty river.

Importance 
The temple is a very awake Kali temple. There are many unknown stories in the temple.

The God of Kali Mata 
The idols of Sri Sri Kali Mata and Shiva are very large and made of stone.

Worship and worship 
On the day of Sri Sri Shyama Puja, Kali Mata is worshiped in the temple and Shiva is worshiped

Extra link

References

Hindu temples in Bangladesh
Habiganj District